The 1981 Toyota Swiss Open was a women's tennis tournament played on outdoor clay courts in Lugano, Switzerland that was part of the Toyota Series of the 1981 WTA Tour. It was the sixth edition of the tournament and was held from 11 May until 17 May 1981. First-seeded Chris Evert-Lloyd won the singles title and earned $20,000 first-prize money.

Finals

Singles
 Chris Evert-Lloyd defeated  Virginia Ruzici 6–1, 6–1
It was Evert-Lloyd's 6th singles title of the year and the 107th of her career.

Doubles
 Rosalyn Fairbank /  Tanya Harford defeated  Candy Reynolds /  Paula Smith 2–6, 6–1, 6–4

References

External links
 ITF tournament edition details

Swiss Open
WTA Swiss Open
Swiss Open
Swiss Open
1981 in Swiss women's sport